South Haryana is an underdeveloped region of the Indian state of Haryana. South Haryana has dearth of essentials i.e. water (Bhakra water), road, transport and protracted demand of University and educational institutes. The Haryana government is discriminating in development of south Haryana. "Neglect" of Rewari-Mahendergarh-Gurgaon belt in terms of development works, government jobs, public transport especially roads and supply of water and power are demands from a long time period.

Important quotes on South Haryana
 "Non equitable distribution of funds by the government and it has ignored Southern Haryana, Ex- Union Minister of State for External Affairs during the previous tenure of Prime Minister Manmohan Singh."
 "South Haryana cries foul over ‘new university’."

Adjacent districts

 Bhiwani
 Mahendragarh at Narnaul
 Rewari
Gurgaon
Faridabad
Palwal
Nuh

Adjacent Towns

 Bawal
 Dadri
 Rewari

See also
 Indira Gandhi Mirpur University, Rewari

References

Regions of Haryana